David Debrandon Brown (born September 25, 1985), professionally known as Lucky Daye, is an American singer-songwriter from New Orleans. He is signed to Keep Cool Records and RCA Records. He released his first EP, I on November 9, 2018 and his second EP, II on February 6, 2019. The EPs were part of a series leading up to his debut studio album Painted which was released on May 24, 2019. His third EP, Table for Two, won the 2022 Grammy Award for Best Progressive R&B Album. His second album, Candydrip, was released on March 10, 2022.

Early life
David Debrandon Brown was born on September 25, 1985 in New Orleans. He was raised in a church that forbade listening to secular music, but he discovered an innate knack for singing and taught himself melodies by turning children books into songs of his own. Brown went back to immerse himself in classic R&B songs and developed a love for artists including Prince, Rick James, Lauryn Hill, and Stevie Wonder. He relocated to Atlanta to pursue music. Sometime in early 2009, he welcomed a daughter named Kaydence with Ashley Lasseter, who is known for her appearance on College Hill: Atlanta. Not much is known of their relationship; in recent years the latter has aired her grievances with the artist via Instagram.

Musical career
In 2005, when he was 19, Daye competed on season 4 of American Idol. He auditioned with a cover of "A Change Is Gonna Come" by Sam Cooke and received four "yes" votes. Soon after reaching the Top 20 he was eliminated from the competition.

Daye established himself as a songwriter and background vocalist and landed credits in 2008 on songs by Keith Sweat on his album Just Me and Ne-Yo on "She Got Her Own". In 2014, he wrote for Boyz II Men on the song "Believe Us". During 2016 and 2017, he co-wrote songs released by Keke Palmer ("Enemiez"), Ella Mai ("10,000 Hours", "Down"), Trey Songz ("Song Goes Off"), and two tracks from the album Strength of a Woman by Mary J. Blige.
In 2017 he worked with Ariana Grande on the song "More" which was scrapped from the latter's fourth studio album Sweetener.

In October 2018, Daye signed to Keep Cool Records and RCA Records, releasing his first single, "Roll Some Mo". On November 9, 2018, he released his first EP, I, which was part of a series leading up to his debut studio album Painted.

On January 17, 2019, Daye released the first single from his second EP, called "Karma". On February 6, 2019, he released the second installment of the EP series, II. He went on tour with Ella Mai beginning in February 2019. In November 2019, Daye received four nominations at the 62nd Grammy Awards including one for Best R&B Album for Painted. On November 21, 2019, Daye opened for R&B singer Khalid on his Free Spirit tour in New Zealand.

On September 25, 2020, he co-wrote "Better", English singer Zayn's single.

On February 12, 2021, Daye released his third EP, Table for Two. It would go on to win the 2022 Grammy Award for Best Progressive R&B Album.

On May 21, 2021, Daye released a cover of Marvin Gaye’s "Mercy Mercy Me (The Ecology)" to celebrate the 50th anniversary of Gaye's album What’s Going On.

On March 10, 2022, Daye released his second studio album, Candydrip. The album received acclaim from critics and became his first album to chart on the US Billboard 200 album chart, debuting at number sixty-nine. Candydrip received a nomination for Best R&B Album while its lead single "Over" received a nod in the Best R&B Performance category for the 2023 edition of the Grammy Awards. In addition, he received two nominations for Album of the Year for both Beyoncé's Renaissance and Mary J. Blige's Good Morning Gorgeous albums as a co-writer and a Best R&B Song nod for co-writing its title track.

Awards and nominations

Discography

Albums

Extended plays

Singles

Guest appearances

References

Living people
21st-century American singers
Musicians from New Orleans
RCA Records artists
1985 births
African-American male singers
American rhythm and blues singers
American soul singers
African-American songwriters
American Idol participants
21st-century American male singers
Singer-songwriters from Louisiana